

Scheduled airlines

Charter airlines

Cargo airlines

See also
 List of defunct airlines of Pakistan
 List of airlines
 List of defunct airlines of Asia
 Civil Aviation Authority of Pakistan
 Transport in Pakistan

References

External links

 Civil Aviation Authority (CAA) of Pakistan
 Pakistani Aviation
 Dawn article titled Airline Industry on the Move
 World Airlines: Pakistan

 
Pakistan
Airlines
Airlines
Pakistan